PZ Cussons Ghana is a major manufacturer of personal healthcare products, and consumer goods. It operates in Ghana, and is a subsidiary of PZ Cussons. They are listed on the stock index of the Ghana Stock Exchange, the GSE All-Share Index. It formed on May 24, 1958.

History
PZ Cussons Ghana Limited is one of the early Companies that was first listed on the Ghana Stock Exchange (GSE) at the inception of the stock exchange in the early 1990s. The Company, which started operations in the then Gold Coast in the 1930s, begun as a trading concern which imported goods from Europe for distribution and sale in the Gold Coast and West Africa as a whole. The Company also engaged in the export of produce from the West African region to Europe.

Operations
PZ Cussons Ghana Limited manufactures, distributes and sells soaps, cosmetics and over-the-counter pharmaceutical preparations. The company's products are for export and also for local Ghanaian consumption.

References

External links
PZ Cussons Ghana Ltd official homepage
GhanaWeb.com
PZ Cussons Ghana Ltd at Bloomberg
PZ Cussons Ghana Ltd at Alacrastore

Manufacturing companies established in 1958
Manufacturing companies based in Accra
Companies listed on the Ghana Stock Exchange
1958 establishments in Ghana